Miami Arena was an indoor arena located in Miami, Florida. The venue served as the home of the NBA's Miami Heat, and the NHL's Florida Panthers. From 1988 until 1999, it also was the indoor arena for the Miami Hurricanes.

History

Completed in 1988 at a cost of $52.5 million, its opening took business away from the Hollywood Sportatorium and eventually led to that venue's demolition. The arena was the home of the Miami Heat from 1988 to 1999, the Florida Panthers from 1993 to 1998, the University of Miami basketball teams from 1988 to 2003, the Miami Hooters of the Arena Football League from 1993 to 1995, the Miami Matadors of the ECHL in 1998 and the Miami Manatees of the WHA2 in 2003. The first game played by the Heat in their first home was a loss to the Los Angeles Clippers, 111–91, on November 5, 1988; the first victory came a month and a half later against the Utah Jazz, 101–80.

The arena also hosted the 1990 NBA All-Star Game, the 1991 WWF Royal Rumble, the 1994 NCAA men's basketball East Regional final, the NHL's 1996 Stanley Cup Finals between the Florida Panthers and Colorado Avalanche and the NBA's 1997 NBA Playoffs Eastern Conference Finals between the Miami Heat and Chicago Bulls.

By 1998, the Miami Arena, like most indoor sports arenas built in the late 1980s, was beginning to show its age, despite being only 10 years old. Its seating capacity was one of the lowest of any NBA or NHL arena. In addition, sports teams in general began wanting newer, more updated facilities, specifically luxury suites and new concessions. In 1998, the Panthers moved into the National Car Rental Center (now FLA Live Arena) in Sunrise, near Florida's largest outlet mall, Sawgrass Mills. On January 2, 2000, the Heat moved to the new American Airlines Arena located three blocks east of Miami Arena on the shore of Biscayne Bay.

After the year 2000, the arena became mostly inactive, as most of the concerts that were held at Miami Arena moved to the newer venues. However, the Miami Manatees of the WHA2 played at the Miami Arena in 2003, and the Miami Morays indoor football from 2005 to 2006.

The arena was easily accessible via mass transit, with a Metrorail stop at Historic Overtown/Lyric Theatre station just across the street (once known as Overtown/Arena station). Miami-Dade city buses also service the arena area downtown. Miami Arena was sometimes called the "Pink Elephant", because it was a white elephant with pink colored walls.

In 2004, the arena was sold in a public auction to Glenn Straub, an investor from Palm Beach County, for half of the price the city of Miami paid for its original construction. On August 3, 2008, Straub announced in a television interview that the interior of the arena had been cleared out and that the building would be demolished by the end of the month. On September 21, 2008, the roof of the Miami Arena was imploded. While the exterior walls remained standing after the implosion, demolition continued until the falling of the west wall on October 21, 2008. A parking lot now exists where the arena used to stand.

Seating capacity
Basketball
 1988–1993 – 15,008
 1993–2008 – 15,200

Ice hockey/arena football
 14,703

Concerts
 Full house: 16,627
 3/4 house: 9,878
 1/2 house: 7,485
 In the round: 16,694
 the space in arena is 1,560

Other
 Banquets – 500 
 Luxury suites – 26

Events

References

External links
 ^ "Miami Arena" Ballparks.com. Retrieved on 2009-07-21.

Sports venues completed in 1988
Sports venues demolished in 2008
Basketball venues in Florida
Music venues in Florida
Indoor ice hockey venues in Florida
Miami Heat venues
Miami Hurricanes basketball venues
Sports venues in Miami
Defunct National Hockey League venues
Former National Basketball Association venues
Defunct college basketball venues in the United States
Demolished music venues in the United States
Defunct indoor arenas in Florida
Demolished sports venues in Florida
1988 establishments in Florida
2008 disestablishments in Florida
Florida Hammerheads
Buildings and structures demolished by controlled implosion
Florida Panthers